David Meyer was a Belgian ice hockey player. He won a silver medal at the Ice Hockey European Championship 1927, and finished fifth at the 1928 Winter Olympics.

References

Date of birth unknown
Date of death unknown
Belgian ice hockey right wingers
Ice hockey players at the 1928 Winter Olympics
Olympic ice hockey players of Belgium